Murutak (also Romanized as Mūrūtak; also known as Mūrūtak-e Pā’īn and Mūrtak-e Pā’īn) is a village in Mud Rural District, Mud District, Sarbisheh County, South Khorasan Province, Iran. At the 2006 census, its population was 16, in 4 families.

References 

Populated places in Sarbisheh County